Carignan is a Spanish variety of grape.

Carignan may also refer to:

 Carignan, Quebec, a town in Quebec, Canada
 Carignan, Ardennes, a commune in France
 House of Savoy-Carignan
 Carignan-Salières Regiment, a French military unit formed by merging the Carignan Regiment and the Salières Regiment in 1659
 the Piedmontese name for Carignano, a municipality in Italy
 Campo de Cariñena, a comarca in Aragon, Spain

People with the surname
Anatole Carignan (1885–1952), Canadian politician
Andrew Carignan (born 1986), American baseball player
Harvey Carignan (1927–2023), American serial killer
Jean Carignan (1916–1988), Canadian fiddler
Jean-Guy Carignan (born 1941), Canadian member of parliament
Jennie Carignan, Canadian general
Nicole Carignan (born 1952), Canadian composer and educator
Onésime Carignan (1839–1897), Canadian grocer and politician
Patrick Carignan (born 1972), Canadian hockey player
Yves Carignan (born 1952), Canadian weightlifter

See also
Cariñena (DO), a Spanish wine region
Carignano (disambiguation)